Wahlenbergia littoralis is a small herbaceous plant in the family Campanulaceae native to eastern Australia.

The species is found in New South Wales, Victoria and Tasmania.

References

littoralis
Flora of New South Wales
Flora of Tasmania
Flora of Victoria (Australia)